William de Moravia (died c. 1226), Lord of Petty, Bracholy, Boharm and Arteldol, was a Scottish noble.

He was the second son of William, son of Freskin. His elder brother was Hugh de Moravia of Duffus and Strathbrock. William gifted the church of Artendol to the Cathedrals of Spynie and Elgin. He was appointed as Sheriff of Inverness and Nairn in 1204. William built the chapel of Galival, near Gauldwell Castle prior to 1222.  He died before October 1226.

Marriage and issue
William, married a daughter of David de Olifard, they are known to have had the following issue:
Walter de Moray (died c. 1278), married a daughter of Máel Coluim II, Earl of Fife, had issue.
William de Moravia, Canon of Moray.

Citations

12th-century Scottish people
13th-century Scottish people
Moray
De Moravia family
Clan Murray
Scottish people of French descent
People of Flemish descent